Roger Federer defeated Lleyton Hewitt in the final, 6–0, 7–6(7–3), 6–0 to win the men's singles tennis title at the 2004 US Open. It was his first US Open title and his fourth major title overall. With the win, he became the tenth man to win three majors in a calendar year.

Andy Roddick was the defending champion, but was defeated in the quarterfinals by Joachim Johansson.

This was also the final major singles appearance of Wayne Ferreira, who was on a record-breaking 56th consecutive major singles appearance, losing in the first round to Hewitt. Ferreira's record was broken by Federer in the 2014 Australian Open.

Seeds

  Roger Federer (champion)
  Andy Roddick (quarterfinals)
  Carlos Moyà (third round)
  Lleyton Hewitt (final)
  Tim Henman (semifinals)
  Andre Agassi (quarterfinals)
  Juan Carlos Ferrero (second round)
  David Nalbandian (second round)
  Gastón Gaudio (second round)
  Nicolás Massú (second round)
  Rainer Schüttler (first round)
  Sébastien Grosjean (second round)
  Marat Safin (first round)
  Fernando González (first round)
  Paradorn Srichaphan (third round)
  Andrei Pavel (fourth round, withdrew)
  Juan Ignacio Chela (first round)
  Tommy Robredo (fourth round)
  Nicolas Kiefer (fourth round)
  Gustavo Kuerten (first round)
  Taylor Dent (second round)
  Dominik Hrbatý (quarterfinals)
  Vince Spadea (second round)
  Ivan Ljubičić (first round)
  Jiří Novák (third round)
  Mardy Fish (second round)
  Mario Ančić (first round)
  Joachim Johansson (semifinals)
  Guillermo Cañas (third round)
  Feliciano López (third round)
  Fabrice Santoro (third round)
  Jonas Björkman (first round)

Qualifying

Draw

Finals

Top half

Section 1

Section 2

Section 3

Section 4

Bottom half

Section 5

Section 6

Section 7

Section 8

External links
 Association of Tennis Professionals (ATP) – 2004 US Open Men's Singles draw
2004 US Open – Men's draws and results at the International Tennis Federation

Men's Singles
US Open (tennis) by year – Men's singles